This is a list of mayors of Rheinfelden, Switzerland. The mayor (Stadtammann) of Rheinfelden chairs the five-member council (Gemeinderat). 

Rheinfelden (Aargau)
Rheinfelden
Lists of mayors (complete 1900-2013)